Harold 'Bill' Scruton (Buster) (born November 18, 1907 in Wakefield, Yorkshire - 1987) was a British soldier posthumously awarded with British Hero of the Holocaust medal.

Biography 
Harold 'Bill' Scruton (Buster) was born in Wakefield on 18 November 1907, and married his wife Ivy in Ripon in 1935. Serving with the Royal Artillery, Bill was sent to France with the British Expeditionary Force and was subsequently captured by the enemy in 1940. He then was sent East to work on farms near the Baltic Coast and as of 1945 was being held in Stalag 20B, Gross Golmkau, 30 km south of Gdansk.

Saving Sarah Matuson 
In 1945 in the latter labor camp, a fellow prisoner Stan Wells found 16 year old Sarah Matuson hiding in a barn.

Sarah, a Lithuanian Jew from Shavli, along with her mother, Gita, and sister, Hannah were 3 of 300 survivors of a forced march of 1200 women from Stuthof Concentration Camp. Compelled to escape by her mother, Sarah succeeded in leaving the line in search of food but was spotted by locals and took refuge in the barn. Severely undernourished and exhausted, Sarah was discovered by Stan who informed her that the locals had given up their search. He reassured her and returned with food, and with the help of his fellow prisoners, Bill Scruton included, smuggled Sarah into Stalag 20B.

For around 3 weeks, Bill and the others hid Sarah in the hayloft of a barn that housed the horses of the local police station and despite the risk of discovery, nursed her back to health. They left Sarah in the care of a sympathetic local women when they were ordered on a forced march themselves, though advancing Russian forces soon liberated all involved.

Sarah was to discover later that her family had not survived the war and in memory of her sister she added ‘Hannah’ to her name. She moved to live with an uncle and started a new life, training as a nurse, marrying William Rigler, a New York Supreme Court Judge, and had two children.

Aftermath and Remembrance 
Though eager to trace the men who had saved her life, Sarah only remembered one full name of the ten British prisoners: Alan Edwards. After a long search and with the assistance of the British War Records Office, Sarah made contact with Alan, and in 1973, the group reunited.

The efforts of Stan Wells, George Hammond, Tommy Noble, Alan Edwards, Roger Letchford, Bill Scruton, Bill Keeble, Bert Hambling, Jack Buckley and Willy Fisher were recognized by Yad Vashem, the Jewish organization which safeguards the memory and meaning of the Holocaust for future generations, and they were awarded a medal and the title of Righteous Among the Nations.

In 2013, six of the group's families were identified and given the posthumous award of British Hero of the Holocaust. Bill Scruton's nieces, Mavis Shaw and Barbara Topham, were traced and awarded Bill's medal which is now on permanent display in the Eden Camp Medal Room.

Sarah published the book ‘Ten British Soldiers Saved My Life’ under her new name of Hannah Sarah Rigler in 2007.

References

External links 
Eden Camp Museum, Hut 19, Medal Room next to WinStan Bunker Cafe

British World War II prisoners of war
1907 births
1987 deaths
People from Wakefield